The Taipei Economic and Cultural Representative Office (TECRO), also known as Taipei Economic and Cultural Office (TECO), Taipei Representative Office (TRO) or Taipei Mission, is an alternative diplomatic institution serving as a de facto embassy or a consulate  of the Republic of China (ROC, commonly referred to as Taiwan) to exercise the foreign affairs and consular services in specific countries which have established formal diplomatic relations with the People's Republic of China (PRC, commonly referred to as China). As the PRC denies the legitimacy of the ROC as a sovereign state and claims the ROC-controlled territories as an integral part of its China. An exclusive mandate namely One-China policy, mandates any country that wishes to establish a diplomatic relationship with the PRC must first sever any formal relationship with the ROC. According to The Fletcher Forum of World Affairs, "non-recognition of the Taiwanese government is a prerequisite for conducting formal diplomatic relations with the PRCin effect forcing other governments to choose between Beijing and Taipei." As a result, these countries only allow the ROC to establish representative offices instead of a fully-fledged embassy or consulate for the purpose of conducting practical bilateral relations without granting full diplomatic recognition.

Except in the United States and Japan, these establishments use the capital city "Taipei" and refrain from using names of "Taiwan", "ROC" or even the term "Nationalist China" (named after the ruling party Kuomintang during Cold War period) since the term "Taipei" avoids implying that Taiwan is a different country on par with the PRC or that there are "Two Chinas", the PRC and the ROC, in order to diminish the obstacles of building pragmatic diplomacy and sidestep the Taiwan issue. Lithuania broke the tradition with the name Taiwanese Representative Office in Lithuania in 2021.  As a result, the PRC downgraded its relations with Lithuania to the charge d'affaires level and expelled its embassy staff from Beijing.

TECROs state that their aim is "to promote bilateral trade, investment, culture, science and technology exchanges and cooperation, as well as better understanding", and provide common citizen services towards overseas Taiwanese, such as issuing visas and passports.

TECROs in the United States enjoy many diplomatic privileges such as extraterritoriality, providing consular protection and their staff have diplomatic immunity.  Other countries also establish reciprocal representative offices in Taiwan, such as the American Institute in Taiwan, Canadian Trade Office in Taipei and Japan–Taiwan Exchange Association.

History

Following the admission of the PRC to the United Nations in 1971, many countries began to establish diplomatic relations with the government in Beijing, and as a consequence, ended diplomatic relations with the Nanjing-based ROC Government stationed in Taipei. In order to maintain trade and cultural ties with countries with which it no longer had diplomatic relations, Taiwan established representative offices in these countries, often replacing its former embassies.

Before the 1990s, the names of these offices would vary considerably from country to country, usually omitting any reference to "Taiwan" or "Republic of China", instead referring to "East Asia", "Far East" or "Free China". They would also describe themselves as "centres" or "offices", concerned with trade, tourism, culture or information, thereby emphasising their private and unofficial status, despite being staffed by Ministry of Foreign Affairs personnel.

For example, in Japan, the former ROC Embassy was replaced by the "Association of East Asian Relations" (AEAR) in 1972. In Malaysia, following the closure of the Consulate General in Kuala Lumpur in 1974, an office known as the Far East Travel and Trade Centre was established. In the Philippines, the former Embassy in Manila was replaced by the "Pacific Economic and Cultural Center", established in 1975. In Thailand, the former Embassy in Bangkok was replaced by the "Office of the Representative of China Airlines" in 1975. This was later renamed the Far East Trade Office in 1980.

In the United States, Taipei's mission, established in 1979, was known as the "Coordination Council for North American Affairs" (CCNAA). As of 2019, it has been renamed "Taiwan Council for US Affairs."

In the United Kingdom, Taiwan was represented by the "Free Chinese Centre", established in 1963. In West Germany, it was represented by a Büro der Fernost-Informationen ("Far East Information Office") established in 1972. In Spain, the office, established in 1973, was known as the Centro Sun Yat-sen ("Sun Yat-sen Centre"). In the Netherlands, the office was known as the "Far East Trade Office".

However, in the late 1980s, these offices began using the name "Taipei" in their titles. In May 1992, the AEAR offices in Japan became Taipei Economic and Cultural Representative Offices. The "Free Chinese Centre" in London was similarly renamed the "Taipei Representative Office". In September 1994, the Clinton Administration announced that the CCNAA office in Washington could similarly be called the Taipei Economic and Cultural Representative Office.
 
Earlier in 1989, the "Pacific Economic and Cultural Center" in Manila  became the "Taipei Economic and Cultural Office in the Philippines".    In 1991, the "Taiwan Marketing Service" office in Canberra, Australia, established in 1988, also became a "Taipei Economic and Cultural Office", along with the "Far East Trading Company" offices in Sydney and Melbourne.

Other names are still used elsewhere; for example, the mission in Moscow is formally known as the "Representative Office in Moscow for the Taipei-Moscow Economic and Cultural Coordination Commission", the mission in New Delhi is known as the "Taipei Economic and Cultural Center". The mission in Pretoria is known as the "Taipei Liaison Office".

The two most recent ones to change their official names, in Papua New Guinea and in Jordan, both use the name Taipei Economic and Cultural Office.

TECRO in the United States

Originally called the Coordination Council for North American Affairs (CCNAA), the name of the CCNAA office in Washington, D.C. (the "embassy") was changed to "Taipei Economic and Cultural Representative Office" (TECRO) as a result of the Clinton Administration's Taiwan Policy Review of 1994. Similarly, the names of the twelve other CCNAA offices ("consulates") in the United States were changed to "Taipei Economic and Cultural Office" (TECO).

On May 24, 2019, Taiwan informed that "the Coordination Council for North American Affairs" was renamed "the Taiwan Council for U.S. Affairs".

In September 2020, the US Ambassador to the United Nations Kelly Craft met with James K.J. Lee, director-general of the Taipei Economic and Cultural Office in New York, who was secretary-general in Taiwan's Ministry of Foreign Affairs until July, for lunch in New York City in what was the first meeting between a top Taiwan official and a United States ambassador to the United Nations. Craft said she and Lee discussed ways the US can help Taiwan become more engaged within the U.N., and she pointed to a December 2019 email alert from Taiwan that WHO had ignored, recognizing and warning about the danger of the person-to-person transmission of the new highly contagious Covid-19 virus in China.

TECRO in Japan

Diplomatic relations between the Republic of China and Japan were broken off in September 1972. For practical reasons, the Association of East Asian Relations (AEAR), was established two months after the Japan-China Joint Communique was signed. EARA had offices in Taipei, Tokyo, Osaka, and Fukuoka. In 1992, Japan authorized the change in name of AEAR to TECRO.

Representations in the PRC Special administrative regions

Hong Kong

In Hong Kong, from 1966, Taiwan was represented by the 'Chung Hwa Travel Service', a name chosen to avoid upsetting Beijing. On 20 July 2011, as a result of warming relations between Taiwan and Beijing, the name was formally changed to the Taipei Economic and Cultural Office, bringing it into line with other Republic of China representative offices around the world.

Macau

In Macau, from 1989 to 1999, Taiwan was represented by the 'Taipei Trade and Tourism Office', Taiwan's first-time representation in Macau after Kuomintang's expulsion from Macau as the consequence of the December 3rd Incident in 1966. From 1999 to 2011, Taiwan was represented by the 'Taipei Economic and Cultural Center'. On 13 May 2012, the name was formally changed to the Taipei Economic and Cultural Office.

TRO in the United Kingdom

In 1950, the UK switched recognition from the Republic of China to the People's Republic of China (PRC) shortly after its establishment, while maintaining the British Consulate in Tamsui, through which the UK continued to carry out consular and trade-related activities. The Consulate was closed after the UK and the PRC upgraded relations to Ambassadorial level in March 1972, and in June 1980 the building and land of the Consulate were returned to the Taiwanese government. The ROC government's office in the UK was set up in September 1963, and at the time was known as the Free Chinese Centre. In 1992, this was revised to become the Taipei Representative Office in the UK.

Taipei Representative Office in Norway 
The Taipei Representative Office in Norway; was a diplomatic mission of Taiwan to Norway that functioned as a de facto embassy. The first representative office of Taiwan in Norway was the Taipei Trade Centre, established in 1980.

In July 2017, the ROC Ministry of Foreign Affairs announced that the office will be suspended on 30 September 2017 and affairs related to Taiwanese in the country will be handled by Taipei Mission in Sweden. The decision was made to improve the efficiency of the foreign diplomatic missions of Taiwan.

Taipei representative offices around the world
The list below shows the countries or regions where TECROs/TROs are established.

G20 nations

Other countries

Former representative offices 
 — Taipei Economic and Cultural Office in Bangladesh (closed in 2009, transferred to Taipei Economic and Cultural Center in India and in Thailand)
 — de facto embassy in Minsk (closed in 2006, transferred to Representative Office in Moscow for the Taipei-Moscow Economic and Cultural Coordination Commission)
 — Taipei Economic Office in La Paz (closed in 2009, transferred to Taipei Economic and Cultural Office in Argentina)
 — de facto embassy in Phnom Penh (closed in 1997, transferred later to Taipei Economic and Cultural Office, Ho Chi Minh City)
 — Taiwan Commercial Office in Tripoli (closed in 2011, transferred to Taipei Economic and Cultural Office in Jordan)
 — Taipei Representative Office in Norway (closed in 2017, transferred to Taipei Mission in Sweden)
 — Taipei Economic Office in Montevideo (closed in 2002 temporary, transferred to Taipei Economic and Cultural Office in Argentina)
 — Taipei Economic Office in Caracas (closed in 2009, transferred to Taipei Commercial Office in Bogotá, Colombia)

See also
 Political status of Taiwan
 Chinese Taipei
 Hong Kong Economic and Trade Office
 Taipei Economic and Cultural Office in Canada
 List of diplomatic missions of Taiwan
 Timeline of diplomatic relations of the Republic of China

References

Further reading

External links

Overseas Office Republic of China (Taiwan)
Bureau of Consular Affairs, Republic of China (Taiwan) 
Chinese International Economic Association Cooperation

 
Politics of Taiwan